Supersymetriya is a studio album by the Ukrainian alternative rock band Okean Elzy released in 2003.

Okean Elzy's frontman Svyatoslav Vakarchuk has a Ph.D. in the field of supersymmetry.

Track listing

 Кішка
 Дівчина (З Іншого Життя)
 Вільний
 Susy.
 Мене
 Для Тебе
 Леді
 Майже Весна
 Холодно
 Віддам
 Невидима Сім`я

References 

2003 albums
Okean Elzy albums
Ukrainian-language albums